Luca Robert Gasparotto (born 9 March 1995) is a retired Canadian soccer player who played as a centre-back.

He has played for Canada at youth level and has been called into the senior squad.

Club career

Early career
Gasparotto began playing soccer with local club Ajax SC, coached by his father, and then moved to Canadian Soccer League side SC Toronto.

Rangers
In 2011, he went overseas to sign with Rangers and made his debut in 2013, coming on for Emílson Cribari in a 2–0 win over Clyde at Ibrox on 13 April 2013. Gasparotto made his second Rangers appearance in a 1–2 defeat to Peterhead at Ibrox on 20 April. Gasparotto made his first start for Rangers on the final day of the 2012–13 season in a 1–0 win over Berwick Rangers.

Gasparotto did not play for Rangers during the 2013–14 season but was loaned out to Stirling Albion. He joined Airdrieonians on 1 September 2014, initially until January, however, this was extended until the summer of 2015.

Greenock Morton
Following a serious injury to Frank McKeown, Gasparotto was signed by Greenock Morton on a short-term deal until January 2016. After impressing in his loan stint, Gasparotto's loan with Morton was extended to the end of the 2015–16 season. After the conclusion of his loan spell with Greenock Morton, Gasparotto announced that he would not be returning to Rangers for the 2016–17 Scottish Premiership season.

Falkirk
In June 2016, Gasparotto joined Scottish Championship side Falkirk.

Second spell at Morton
In November 2017, Gasparotto returned to Greenock Morton on an emergency loan deal until the start of January 2018, whereupon he signed a permanent deal until the end of the 2017–18 season. He was released at the end of the season.

York9
On 14 February 2019, Gasparotto returned to Canada, signing with Canadian Premier League side York9. He made his first appearance for York9 in their inaugural match against Forge FC on 27 April 2019. He scored his first goal for the Nine Stripes in a Canadian Championship match against FC Edmonton on 5 June 2019. Gasparotto ended up playing every single minute for York9 in 2019, 28 league games and 6 in the Canadian Championship, the only CPL player to do so. On November 3, 2020, he announced his retirement from professional football, citing a desire to pursue a career outside of football.

Later career
In 2021, he began attending Humber College, where he joined the men's soccer team.

International career
He was called into a training camp for the Canada national team in January 2014, whilst on loan at Stirling. Gasparotto was again called into the  squad for a training camp in March 2015.

He has also played for Canada at U17 (including three games at the U17 World Cup in Mexico) and U20 level. In August 2015, Gasparotto was called up for 2018 FIFA World Cup qualifiers against Belize. In May 2016, Gasparotto was called to Canada's U23 national team for a pair of friendlies against Guyana and Grenada. He saw action in both matches.

Gasparotto was called up to the senior Canada squad for a 2018 FIFA World Cup qualifier against Belize in September 2015.

Personal life
Gasparotto was born in North York, Ontario to a Canadian mother and an Australian father. When he was one year old, his family moved to Ajax, Ontario. His father was born in Queanbeyan, New South Wales.

Career statistics

Honours
Individual
Airdrieonians Young Player of the Year: 2014–15
Airdrieonians Player of the Year: 2014–15

References

External links
 
 
 

1995 births
Living people
Association football defenders
Canadian soccer players
People from Ajax, Ontario
Soccer players from Toronto
Sportspeople from North York
Canadian people of Australian descent
Canadian people of Italian descent
Canadian expatriate soccer players
Expatriate footballers in Scotland
Canadian expatriate sportspeople in Scotland
SC Toronto players
Rangers F.C. players
Stirling Albion F.C. players
Airdrieonians F.C. players
Greenock Morton F.C. players
Falkirk F.C. players
York United FC players
Canadian Soccer League (1998–present) players
Scottish Professional Football League players
Scottish Football League players
Canadian Premier League players
Canada men's youth international soccer players
Canada men's under-23 international soccer players
2015 CONCACAF U-20 Championship players
Humber College alumni